KTYL may refer to:

 KTYL-FM, a radio station (93.1 FM) licensed to Tyler, Texas, United States
 Taylor Municipal Airport in Taylor, Texas, United States